Gualberto Gutiérrez (born 25 January 1940) is a Uruguayan boxer. He competed in the men's lightweight event at the 1960 Summer Olympics. At the 1960 Summer Olympics, he lost to Eddie Blay of Ghana.

References

1940 births
Living people
Uruguayan male boxers
Olympic boxers of Uruguay
Boxers at the 1960 Summer Olympics
People from Soriano Department
Pan American Games medalists in boxing
Pan American Games silver medalists for Uruguay
Boxers at the 1959 Pan American Games
Lightweight boxers
Medalists at the 1959 Pan American Games